Quality Soft Core is the first full-length release from the Mad Caddies.

Track listing
 "I'm So Alone" – 4:09
 "Distress" – 3:49
 "Cup O' Tea" – 1:44
 "The Bell Tower" – 2:42
 "No Sé" – 2:41
 "Crew Cut Chuck" – 1:56
 "Goleta" – 1:24
 "Big Brother" – 3:25
 "LG's" – 3:20
 "Polyester Khakis" – 2:20
 "Preppie Girl" – 2:35
 "Mum's the Word" – 1:38
 "Sad Reggie" – 4:50

Mad Caddies albums
1997 debut albums
Honest Don's Records albums